Sunnyside United Methodist Church, or Sunnyside Centenary United Methodist Church, is a church located at the intersection of Southeast 35th and Yamhill, in Portland, Oregon's Sunnyside neighborhood, in the United States.

History
The congregation formed in 1890, at a shoe factory on Southeast 36th and Main. Members built a wooden structure in 1891, for $2,000. The present stone building was completed in 1911, and the church's 420 members made Sunnyside United Methodist one of the largest congregations in the Pacific Northwest.

The church has housed the Camp Fire summer Numanu in the City program, Children's Club, Common Cup (homeless shelter), Hard Times Suppers, PDX Toy Library, Raphael House, Alcoholics Anonymous meetings, and basketball groups, among other organizations. In September 2015, the building became property of Oregon-Idaho Annual Conference.

See also
 List of Methodist churches in the United States

References

External links

 

1890 establishments in Oregon
1911 establishments in Oregon
Churches completed in 1911
Churches in Portland, Oregon
Sunnyside, Portland, Oregon
United Methodist churches in Oregon